Hubert Meunier (born 14 December 1959) is a retired Luxembourgian football defender.

References

1959 births
Living people
Luxembourgian footballers
FC Progrès Niederkorn players
Jeunesse Esch players
FC Avenir Beggen players
Association football defenders
Luxembourg international footballers